The Fleadh Cheoil (meaning "festival of music") is an Irish music festival run by Comhaltas Ceoltóirí Éireann (CCÉ), a non-profit organisation. The festival includes live music events as well as competition. Each year a single town or city hosts the Fleadh: it has been held in Mullingar, Sligo, and Tullamore, among others.

There are various stages to the competition. In Ireland there are county and provincial competitions leading to the All-Ireland Fleadh. In Britain there are regional, then national stages of qualification for the All-Ireland. North America has two regional qualifying Fleadh Cheoil.  The Mid-Atlantic Fleadh covers the Eastern Seaboard, eastern Canada and the Maritimes. The Midwest Fleadh covers the rest of North America from Cleveland, Chicago, St. Louis, Atlanta and Detroit to San Francisco.

Competitions are divided into the following age categories: under 12, 12–15, 15–18, and over 18 (senior).

History
The first national festival of Irish traditional music was held in Mullingar in 1951.   At its inaugural meeting in September 1951, CCÉ came up with the title of Fleadh Cheoil, aiming to make this a great national festival of traditional music. The fleadh has been held in many different venues.

In the years that followed, the number of would-be competitors grew so large that qualifying stages had to be arranged at county and provincial levels. Since then, Fleadh Nua (the new fleadh), Fleadh na Breataine (an All-Britain fleadh) and regional fleadhanna in Britain, and two major fleadhanna in the USA have also become annual CCÉ events.

From its beginning, the goal of the Fleadh Cheoil was to establish standards in Irish traditional music through competition. The fleadh developed as a mainly competitive event, but it also included many concerts, parades, and sessions.

Today, nearly 55 years on, fleadhanna at each level provide a platform and a meeting place for the thousands of musicians, singers and dancers who carry on the tradition.  Around 20,000 performers compete in fleadhanna each year.

The 2008 festival was held in Tullamore, County Offaly and attracted an estimated crowd of 250,000 people making it Ireland's largest festival, music or otherwise. The Fleadh came to Sligo in 2014 and 2015.

The 2016 festival was held in Ennis, County Clare and attracted an estimated crowd of 400,000 people over the nine days from 14 to 22 August. Among the visitors to the 2016 Fleadh was President Michael D Higgins, who went to school near Ennis. 10,000 musicians took part in 2016, with 6,000 of them participating in 180 All-Ireland competitions. An estimated €38 million was spent as 80,000 visitors were in Ennis at any one time. There were 28 concerts, with five held in the 2,000-seater Shannon Aerodome at Tim Smythe Park in the town. 
The 2017 Fleadh Cheoil returned to Ennis from 13 to 21 August. The 2017 festival was opened by Michael Flatley, and over 450,000 people attended, peaking on the Saturday. 

The largest fleadh to date was 2018 in Drogheda, an event estimated to have attracted over 600,000 people. The 2022 Fleadh Cheoil in Mullingar is assumed to have attracted crowds of over 500,000 people from across Ireland and the world.

Competition categories
According to CCÉ's official rules for 2005:

 Solo competitions for slow airs shall be held in all age groups for the following instruments: (a) fiddle; (b) concert flute; (c) whistle; (d) uilleann pipes; and (e) harp (as of 2010).

There are also competitions for the following ensembles: duet, trio, céilí band, instrumental group, accordion band, pipe band, and miscellaneous ensemble.

The full rule set, which may change from year to year, is available from CCÉ web site in the Press Room section. Comhaltas has a constitution in the Irish language.

Application
Towns and cities wishing to host Fleadh Cheoil na hÉireann must submit several applications to Ardchomhairle an Chomaltais – the highest committee within CCÉ. Certain members of the Ardchomhairle then inspect the applicant towns and the locations that have been proposed as competition venues, before coming to a final decision several weeks after the preceding fleadh, usually in September. Once a town has been chosen to host the Fleadh, it undertakes to host the festival for two consecutive years. However, Comhaltas has the right to deny any the successful town the Fleadh for the second year if poor venues, organisational problems, etc. are demonstrated on the town's first year of hosting. On 10 September 2011, the 2012 All-Ireland Fleadh Cheoil was awarded to Cavan, County Cavan, for the third year in succession. The other towns who applied for the 2012 festival were Ennis, County Clare; and Sligo, County Sligo. The Fleadh was held in Derry in 2013, the first time that it was held in Northern Ireland. One of the primary reasons for holding the Fleadh in Derry was due to that city being awarded the UK City of Culture for 2013. In 2014, it was confirmed that the Fleadh Cheoil would be held in Sligo for 2014 and 2015. Ennis hosted the Fleadh in August 2016 and 2017, with Drogheda hosting in 2018 and 2019. Mullingar were the planned hosts for 2020 and 2021 (cancelled due to COVID-19 in Ireland), and finally hosted in 2022, the first in-person Fleadh Cheoil since 2019. An online "FleadhFest" took place in 2021, with a showpiece in Sligo. The 2023 All-Ireland Fleadh is set to take place in Mullingar for a second consecutive year from 6 August to 14 August; Belfast and Wexford made unsuccessful bids to host the event in 2023.

See also
Comhaltas Ceoltóirí Éireann
List of All-Ireland Fleadh champions
List of venues for All-Ireland Fleadh Cheoil na hÉireann

References

External links
 Official Fleadh Cheoil site
 Rules set by Comhaltas Ceoltóirí Éireann

Annual events in Ireland
Traditional music festivals in Ireland
Celtic music festivals
Music festivals established in 1951
1951 establishments in Ireland